Anthony Scribe (born 1 January 1988) is a French professional football player who plays for US Lège Cap Ferret in the Championnat National 3.

Career
Scribe played 13 minutes in the Ligue 2 for Montpellier HSC on 10 April 2008 as substitute for Karim Aït-Fana, after the red card for first keeper Geoffrey Jourdren against AC Ajaccio.

References

External links

Living people
1988 births
Sportspeople from Saint-Germain-en-Laye
French footballers
Footballers from Yvelines
Association football goalkeepers
Ligue 2 players
Championnat National players
Championnat National 2 players
Championnat National 3 players
Erovnuli Liga players
Montpellier HSC players
Thonon Evian Grand Genève F.C. players
USC Corte players
AC Ajaccio players
FC Dinamo Tbilisi players
UMS Montélimar players
Stade Bordelais (football) players
French expatriate footballers
French expatriate sportspeople in Georgia (country)
Expatriate footballers in Georgia (country)